Aclytia heber is a moth of the family Erebidae. It was described by Pieter Cramer in 1780. It is found in Mexico, Guatemala, Costa Rica, Honduras, Cuba, Trinidad, Suriname and Brazil (Rio de Janeiro). A single specimen was collected at Alamo, Texas in November 2012.

References

Moths described in 1780
Aclytia
Moths of North America
Moths of South America